Doctor Klaus is a 1920 German silent comedy film directed by Heinrich Bolten-Baeckers and starring Conrad Dreher.

Cast
In alphabetical order
 Leona Bergere as Marie
 Conrad Dreher as Lubowski
 Lilly Flohr as Haushälterin Marianne
 Sabine Impekoven as Klementine
 Lisl Kehm as Julie
 Carl Heinz Klubertanz as Referendar Gerstel
 Erich Kämmerer as Bauer
 Richard Ludwig as Max von Boden
 Gertrud Rottenberg as Emma
 Gustav Rudolph as Dr. Klaus
 Hans Stock as Juwelier Leopold Grisinger
 Vilma von Mayburg as Frau von Schlingen

References

Bibliography
 Michael Töteberg. Das Ufa-Buch. Zweitausendeins, 1992.

External links

1920 films
Films of the Weimar Republic
German silent feature films
Films directed by Heinrich Bolten-Baeckers
German comedy films
1920 comedy films
UFA GmbH films
German black-and-white films
Silent comedy films
1920s German films
1920s German-language films